Angeta Rud-e Pain (also Romanized as Angetā Rūd-e Pā’īn; also known as Angetā Rūd) is a village in Mianrud Rural District, Chamestan District, Nur County, Mazandaran Province, Iran. At the 2006 census, its population was 420, in 88 families.

References 

Populated places in Nur County